Aka Wilfried Julien Kanga (born 21 February 1998) is a professional footballer who plays as a right winger for German  club Hertha BSC. Born in France, he plays for the Ivory Coast national team.

Club career
Kanga is a youth product of PSG, and moved on loan to US Créteil-Lusitanos, after signing his first professional contract. After his successful season in the Championnat National, Kanga was transferred to Angers in the Ligue 1. He made his professional debut for Angers, in a Ligue 1 1–1 tie with Lille on 27 August 2017.

On 30 July 2022, Kanga signed a four-year contract with Hertha BSC in Germany.

International career
Kanga was born in France and is of Ivorian descent, and represented the Ivory Coast U20s in a 3–2 friendly victory over the Qatar U20s in March 2016.

Kanga switched and represented the France U20s at the 2018 Toulon Tournament. He scored on his debut against the South Korea U20s on 28 May 2018.

Kanga switched back to represent the senior Ivory Coast national team in September 2022, and debuted with them in a friendly 2–1 win over Togo national team on 25 September 2022.

Career statistics
<ref>

References

External links
 Profile at the Hertha BSC website
 
 
 
 Culture PSG Profile
 
 

1995 births
Living people
Sportspeople from Montreuil, Seine-Saint-Denis
Footballers from Seine-Saint-Denis
Association football forwards
Ivorian footballers
Ivory Coast international footballers
Ivory Coast under-20 international footballers
French footballers
France youth international footballers
French sportspeople of Ivorian descent
Paris Saint-Germain F.C. players
US Créteil-Lusitanos players
Angers SCO players
Kayserispor footballers
BSC Young Boys players
Hertha BSC players
Ligue 1 players
Championnat National players
Championnat National 2 players
Süper Lig players
Swiss Super League players
French expatriate footballers
Ivorian expatriate footballers
Expatriate footballers in Turkey
French expatriate sportspeople in Turkey
Ivorian expatriate sportspeople in Turkey
Expatriate footballers in Switzerland
French expatriate sportspeople in Switzerland
Ivorian expatriate sportspeople in Switzerland
Expatriate footballers in Germany
French expatriate sportspeople in Germany
Ivorian expatriate sportspeople in Germany